Heita Tameike Dam is an earthfill dam located in Yamagata Prefecture in Japan. The dam is used for irrigation. The catchment area of the dam is 1.7 km2. The dam impounds about 2  ha of land when full and can store 80 thousand cubic meters of water. The construction of the dam was started on 1953 and completed in 1958.

References

Dams in Yamagata Prefecture
1958 establishments in Japan